Bifluranol (brand name Prostarex; former developmental code name BX-341) is a synthetic nonsteroidal estrogen of the stilbestrol group related to diethylstilbestrol that has been used as an antiandrogen in the United Kingdom in the treatment of benign prostatic hyperplasia. It is a polyfluorinated biphenyl that is related to polybrominated and polychlorinated biphenyls and diethylstilbestrol. The drug is described as a weak estrogen, and possesses about one-eighth the potency of diethylstilbestrol.

In spite of the fact that it is widely referred to as an antiandrogen in the literature, bifluranol is actually a pure estrogen and does not significantly bind to the androgen receptor or directly antagonize the action of androgens. It exerts functional antiandrogen effects by binding to and activating the estrogen receptor in the pituitary gland, consequently suppressing the secretion of luteinizing hormone (and hence acting as an antigonadotropin) and thereby reducing gonadal androgen production and systemic androgen levels. Bifluranol has also been found to act as a 17α-hydroxylase/17,20 lyase inhibitor, though with less potency than ketoconazole, and this action may contribute to its efficacy in benign prostatic hyperplasia by further helping to lower androgen levels.

Related drugs include pentafluranol (BX-430) and terfluranol (BX-428), which are also estrogens.

See also 
 Acefluranol
 Paroxypropione
 Metallibure

References 

Abandoned drugs
Antigonadotropins
CYP17A1 inhibitors
Enzyme inhibitors
Fluoroarenes
Synthetic estrogens